Nayrouz is a feast when martyrs and confessors are commemorated within the Coptic Orthodox Church. Celebrated on September 11, the day is both the start of the Coptic new year and its first month, Thout.

Despite having religious connotations and being celebrated by the Coptic Christian community today, the festival used to be much more widespread and celebrated by both Christian and Muslim Egyptians. However, due to repressions by the central government, it lost much of its significance as a popular festival.

Origins and etymology 
Multiple theories have been proposed for the origin of the word. One popular theory, repeated on many websites, is that the word is Coptic in origin: Ignorant of the Coptic language for the most part, the Arabs confused the Coptic new year's celebrations, which the Copts called the feast of Ni-Iarōou (Bohairic  lit. the feast of the rivers), with the Persian feast of Nowruz, from which the word Nayrouz etymologically comes. The misnomer remains today, and the celebrations of the Coptic new year on the first day of the month of Thout are known as the Nayrouz. Others dispute this view, and hold that the word is fully Persian. They note that the word Nayrouz does not occur anywhere in the Synaxarium, that there is no evidence of the use of the supposed Coptic etymon in historical sources, and that a Persian etymology sufficiently explains the current name. The recorded Bohairic name for the new year was  pi-klhom inte-tirompi, "the crown of the year."

During the reign of Khosrow II (590–628), the Persians reached Egypt for the second time in history, and established control for a decade (Sasanian Egypt). According to Touraj Daryaee, the celebration of Nayrouz in Egypt may be one of the lasting Sassanid influences in Egypt.

Its celebration falls on the 1st day of the month of Thout, the first month of the Egyptian year, which for AD 1901 to 2098 usually coincides with 11 September, except before a Gregorian leap year when it begins September 12.

History and traditions 

The first documented celebration of Nayrouz in Egypt dates back to 912 AD.

Both Christians and Muslims, the elite and the common people participated in Nayrouz celebrations, with customs such as the exchange of gifts, eating special food, and wearing new garments observed by the upper class. The Fatimid court, for example, would distribute luxurious fabrics and robes, and sometimes even money, to mark the occasion. For the celebration in 1123, a special kiswah and other luxurious fabrics were produced at the Alexandrian textile workshop. The common people also engaged in special food and drink, including the consumption of wine and beer in public.

Nayrouz was also characterized by sexual overtones and transvestism, with people engaging in water games and stripping naked in public. Transvestites and prostitutes would gather in specific areas, such as under the Pearl Palace, to be seen and heard by the Egyptian ruler. The festival also featured masks and masquerades, compared to European carnivals, with crowds marching in the streets of Cairo, theatrical performances, and even man-made imitations of elephants.

The high point of Nayrouz was the procession of the "emir of Nayrouz", who was elected by the Cairene crowd. This "emir" was expected to be a wanton and "of firm nature", and would ride a small and ugly donkey, possibly a remnant of a pagan rite. The "emir" would "visit" the homes of dignitaries and officials, and hand them a statement about a "debt". Anyone who refused to pay would be scorned, cursed, and hard-pressed until willing to clear the "debt". Privacy was often violated, with gates broken and water poured on doorsteps of those who locked their homes to prevent intruders. Frazer noted the similarity between "emir of Nayrouz" and Lord of Misrule.

Despite the festive nature of Nayrouz, there were also criticisms of its negative effects, not just on the common people but on the learned as well. Schools would be shut down, teachers were attacked, insulted, and sometimes even thrown into fountains.

Decline 
The festival was frequently repressed by authorities and theologians in medieval Cairo. The Abbasid governor of Egypt ordered transvestites who participated in the festival to march around a mosque in Old Cairo in 913 to be ridiculed, and in 946 the custom of spraying water during the festival was banned. In 974, al-Muizz forbade the lighting of bonfires and spraying water on the festival, and in 1023 the "play with water" was banned once again. Some time prior to 1198, celebrations were interdicted. In 1380, the play with water was banned again, and individuals were punished in public, including having their hands chopped off. In 1385, Sultan Barquq ordered the celebrations to be abolished altogether, and officials arrested those found participating in the festival. According to another source, until 1389 only the sprinkling of water and beating with leather were allowed; the lighting of bonfires was restricted to the dwelling of the Copts.

During the Nayrouz of 1435, no festivities were seen because of the sultan's ban. About that time, the historian al-Maqrizi remarked on the disappearance of the festival altogether. Despite the efforts to repress the celebration, it appears to have survived in some form in Egyptian provinces up until the beginning of the 20th century, potentially due to the distance from the central bureaucracy.

The Coptic year
The chronology of the Coptic Orthodox Church begins when Diocletian became Roman emperor in 284 AD. His reign was marked by torture of Christians to force them to deny their faith, as well as by mass executions, especially in Egypt. It is believed this time was one of the worst times that the Coptic church faced, known to believers as "the martyrdom era". Hence, the Coptic year is identified by the abbreviation A.M. (for Anno Martyrum or "Year of the Martyrs"). It should not be confused with the A.M. abbreviation used for the unrelated Jewish year, which is Anno Mundi ("year of the world").

See also
 Coptic Calendar
 Copts
 Coptic Orthodox Church
 Sasanian Egypt

References

Sources
 

Coptic Orthodox Church
September observances
Christian festivals and holy days
New Year celebrations
Observances honoring the dead
Christian martyrs
Sasanian Egypt